Patrick James Hogan (30 May 1891 – 14 July 1936) was an Irish Fine Gael politician who served Minister for Agriculture from 1922 to 1924 and 1930 to 1932, Minister for Agriculture and Lands from 1924 to 1930 and Minister for Labour from July 1922 to October 1922. He served as a Teachta Dála (TD) for the Galway constituency from 1921 to 1936.

Early life
Hogan was born in Kilrickle near Bullaun, County Galway, the son of Michael Hogan, a farmer, and his wife Bridget (née Glennon). He was educated at St. Joseph's College in Ballinasloe and, after completing a BA in history at University College Dublin, was apprenticed to an Ennis solicitor, J. B. Lynch, a relative of his father, and qualified in 1914.

Political career
Hogan's interest in politics can be traced back to 1910. He frequently collected newspaper cuttings of speeches made during the two general election campaigns that year. Hogan had virtually no active role in political affairs over the next few years and, unlike his brothers, he did not join the Irish Republican Brotherhood or the Irish Volunteers. In spite of this he joined Sinn Féin shortly after the 1916 Easter Rising. Hogan, being mistaken for one of his brothers, was arrested in error in 1921 and interned with other republicans in Ballykinlar.

Despite his lack of a fighting record, Hogan's local connections made him a particularly good election candidate in his home constituency of Galway. He was elected to Dáil Éireann at the 1921 general election. Hogan later supported the Anglo-Irish Treaty and was appointed to the subsequent government as the non-cabinet Minister for Agriculture in 1922. He held the same position in the provisional government, while also briefly serving as Minister for Labour, before retaining the agriculture portfolio in the 1st Executive Council of the Irish Free State. The new Cumann na nGaedheal government believed that a better performance in the agriculture sector would help the economy of the fledgling new state. Hogan adopted policies which aimed at improving the competitiveness of agricultural exports. The new Department of Agriculture set standards for production and presentation in eggs, meat and butter. It also extended the farm advisory service and tried to improve breeding stocks and crops. As Minister, Hogan also believed that land purchase was a desirable development. His Land Act, 1923 ordered the compulsory purchase of all land still held by landlords. This process took nearly fifteen years to complete, however, by 1937 all Irish farmers owned their farms. In 1927, Hogan established the Agricultural Credit Association to make loans available to farmers who wanted to improve their farms.

Hogan was killed in a car accident in Aughrim, County Galway, on 14 July 1936, while still a serving TD.

Personal life
Hogan married Mona Davitt (née Farrell), widow with a young son, on 8 January 1930. She had been married to Dr. Michael Davitt, a son of Michael Davitt. They had four daughters, including Brigid Hogan-O'Higgins, who was a Fine Gael TD for several Galway constituencies between 1957 and 1977.

See also
Families in the Oireachtas

References

 

Politicians from County Galway
1891 births
1936 deaths
Cumann na nGaedheal TDs
Fine Gael TDs
Members of the 2nd Dáil
Members of the 3rd Dáil
Members of the 4th Dáil
Members of the 5th Dáil
Members of the 6th Dáil
Members of the 7th Dáil
Members of the 8th Dáil
Road incident deaths in the Republic of Ireland
Early Sinn Féin TDs
Ministers for Agriculture (Ireland)
People of the Irish Civil War (Pro-Treaty side)
People educated at Garbally College
Alumni of University College Dublin